Bilinichnus simplex is a trace fossil from the Ediacaran period which consists of two parallel ridges on sandstone bed sole which have been interpreted as trails of peristaltic locomotion of a unknown gastropod-like animal leaving these traces behind or as pseudofossil of some kind.

See also

 List of ediacaran genera

References

Aquatic animals
Trace fossils
Ediacaran
Ediacaran life
Enigmatic prehistoric animal genera